The 1956 United States Senate election in New Hampshire took place on November 6, 1956. Incumbent Republican Senator Norris Cotton won re-election to a full term, having first been elected in a 1954 special election.

Primary elections
Primary elections were held on September 11, 1956.

Democratic primary

Candidates
Laurence M. Pickett, former Mayor of Keene, unsuccessful candidate for Democratic nomination for U.S. Senator in 1954

Results

Republican primary

Candidates
Norris Cotton, incumbent United States Senator
Joseph Moore, unsuccessful candidate for Democratic nomination for U.S. Representative in 1946 and 1954

Results

General election

Results

See also 
 1956 United States Senate elections

References

Bibliography
 
 

1956
New Hampshire
United States Senate